"This Summer" is a song by Squeeze released as the first single from their eleventh album, Ridiculous.

Two versions of the single were released, each with entirely different B-sides. Disc 1 contained a live cover of Britpop group Blur's song "End of a Century".  The single peaked at number 36 in the UK Singles Chart in September 1995. A remix reached number 32 in the UK Chart in August 1996.

Track listing
CD #1
 "This Summer" (3:39)
 "End of a Century (live)" (2:44)
 "Periscope" (3:54)
CD #2
 "This Summer" (3:39)
 "Goodbye Girl (live)" (2:35)
 "All the King's Horses" (4:08)

1996 remix and re-release

The remix was released as a UK single in 1996, almost a year after the original. It charted marginally better, peaking at #32; to date, this represents Squeeze's final appearance on any singles chart in any country. 

Three versions of the single were released, each with a different set of B-sides.

Track listing
CD #1
 "This Summer (remix)" (3:37)
 "Electric Trains (Narrow Gauge mix)" (4:51)
 "Heaven Knows" (3:42)
 "This Summer" (3:38)
CD #2
 "This Summer (remix)" (3:37)
 "Cool for Cats" (3:12)
 "Up the Junction" (3:11)
 "Black Coffee In Bed" (6:09)
CD #3
 "This Summer (remix)" (3:37)
 "Sweet as a Nut" (3:41)
 "In Another Lifetime" (3:35)
 "Never There" (3:04)

References

External links
Squeeze discography at Squeezenet

Squeeze (band) songs
1995 singles
1996 singles
Songs written by Glenn Tilbrook
Songs written by Chris Difford
1995 songs
A&M Records singles